Time Traveling Bong is an American miniseries created and written by Ilana Glazer, Paul W. Downs, and Lucia Aniello. The series, starring Glazer and Downs and directed by Aniello, aired on Comedy Central as a "three-night event" with each episode premiering nightly from April 20, 2016 until April 22, 2016.  In syndication, the series airs as a TV movie rather than in episodes.

Synopsis
Two cousins, Sharee and Jeff, discover a water pipe that can be used to travel through time when smoked.  After visiting various points in the past, Sharee and Jeff must find a way to return to the present after the bong is damaged.

Cast
Ilana Glazer as Sharee
Paul W. Downs as Jeff
Nathan Barnatt as Clyde
Kevin Heffernan as Donnie
DJ Qualls as Future Man
June Carryl as Future Woman
Ken Cheeseman as Reverend Hale/Sir Ipswich (Episode 1)

Production
On January 6, 2016, the series was greenlit for a 3-episode order.

Episodes

References

External links
 
 

Comedy Central original programming
2016 American television series debuts
2016 American television series endings
2010s American time travel television series
American time travel television series
Television series by 3 Arts Entertainment
2010s American comedy television miniseries
2010s American comic science fiction television series
English-language television shows
Incest in television
American television series about cannabis